The Barber of Rio (Italian: Il barbiere di Rio) is a 1996 Italian comedy film directed by Giovanni Veronesi.

Cast
Diego Abatantuono as Matteo
Zuleika Dos Santos as Giorginha
Rocco Papaleo as Ugo
Giuseppe Oristanio as Rocco
Margaret Mazzantini as Silvia
Renata Fronzi as Angelina
Dario Tata as Alex
Claudio Bignone as Simone
Antonio Petrocelli as the policeman
Irene Grandi as Guardian angel
Mauro Di Francesco, Nini Salerno and Ugo Conti as Italians in Rio

References

External links

1996 films
Films directed by Giovanni Veronesi
1990s Italian-language films
1996 comedy films
Italian comedy films
1990s Italian films